David Haworth Bailey (September 27, 1830 – January 20, 1896) was an American diplomat who served for 10 years in Hong Kong and Shanghai.

Early life
Bailey was born September 27, 1830, in Wilmington, Ohio, the son of Macajah Bailey and Phebe Haworth.

He attended Woodward College in Cincinnati for 2 years. He worked an attorney at law and as a newspaper editor in Cincinnati, Leavenworth, Kansas and Wilmington, Ohio.

He was a Worthy Grand Master of the American Protestant Association of Ohio and a Right Worthy Grand Master of the national association from 1855 to 1857.  He was a member of the Kansas Legislature from 1860 to 1861 and a presidential elector (Ulysses S. Grant and Schuyler Colfax) for the 6th Ohio District in 1868.

Diplomatic career

In 1870, Bailey was appointed United States Consul in Hong Kong where he served until 1878.  In that year he was appointed United States Consul General in Shanghai where he served until 1880.  During that time, former President Grant visited Shanghai and Bailey was responsible for entertaining him.

John Singleton Mosby who succeeded Bailey in Hong Kong found discrepancies in his predecessor's recordkeeping, and believed Bailey had colluded with his vice-consul Loring (who Mosby fired), to bilk the government of thousands of dollars in fees. Mosby believed Bailey had pocketed fees charged Chinese emigrants sailing to the U.S. on foreign-flag ships (certifying that they emigrated voluntarily and were not part of notorious "coolie traffic"), and claimed "expenses" for shipboard examinations (by the illiterate proprietor of a local boardinghouse frequented by sailors) of those emigrating on U.S.-flag ships equal to the fees charged. Mosby thought Bailey had almost doubled his salary over the previous eight years by embezzlement and kickbacks, and stopped charging for shipboard examinations (which he personally conducted).

The investigations into allegation made by Mosby led to Bailey (and US Minister George Seward's) resignations.  In 1884, Bailey was sued by the United States Government for $39,000 to recover fees collected by him but not accounted for.  He made no defence.  At the time he was reported to still be living in Hong Kong.

Family
Bailey married Clara Esther Harlan.   They had three children: Barclay Bailey, Susannah Bailey who married E. Venable, and Harlan Bailey who married Merrie.

Death
Bailey died on January 20, 1896, in Wilmington Ohio.   He was interred in Sugar Grove Cemetery in Wilmington

References 

1830 births
1896 deaths
American diplomats
Consuls general of the United States in Shanghai
Woodward High School (Cincinnati, Ohio) alumni